Biochanin A is an O-methylated isoflavone. It is a natural organic compound in the class of phytochemicals known as flavonoids. Biochanin A can be found in red clover in soy, in alfalfa sprouts, in peanuts, in chickpea (Cicer arietinum) and in other legumes.

Biochanin A is classified as a phytoestrogen and has putative benefits in dietary cancer prophylaxis. It has also been found to be a weak inhibitor of fatty acid amide hydrolase in vitro.

Biochanin A can block the vasoconstriction in a dose-dependent manner due to the inhibition of L-type calcium channels. Such vasodilatory effect, in micromolar concentrations,  is of potential clinical interest for the management of cardiovascular pathologies.

Metabolism
The enzyme biochanin-A reductase uses dihydrobiochanin A and NADP+ to produce biochanin A, NADPH, and H+.  The enzyme isoflavone-7-O-beta-glucoside 6"-O-malonyltransferase uses malonyl-CoA and biochanin A 7-O-β-D-glucoside to produce CoA and biochanin A 7-O-(6-O-malonyl-β-D-glucoside).

See also
 List of phytochemicals in food
 Prunetin

References

Aromatase inhibitors
O-methylated isoflavones
Phytoestrogens
Selective ERβ agonists